The Cerro El Veladero is a mountain in the state of Guerrero to the north of Acapulco.

Location

The Cerro El Veladero is southwest of El Veladero (Veladero Morelos), northwest of Carabalí and northeast of Pueblo Nuevo. 
It was the site of the Battle of El Veladero during the Mexican War of Independence.

Park

The mountain is protected by the Parque nacional El Veladero, created in 1980 with an area of almost .
The park was created with the goal of improving the environment of the area known as the amphitheater of Acapulco Bay and the Cerro Veladero, which has historical importance.
Vegetation is medium forest with isolated oaks.
Fauna include songbirds, osprey, iguana and boa.

Notes

Sources

Mountains of Mexico
Protected areas of Guerrero